Victoria City Athletic Club, is a football club based in Victoria, Seychelles. It currently plays in Seychelles League. In 2013, the club has won the Seychelles League.

Stadium

Currently the team plays at the 10,000 capacity Stade Linité.

References

External links

Victoria, Seychelles
Football clubs in Seychelles